
Year 173 BC was a year of the pre-Julian Roman calendar. At the time it was known as the Year of the Consulship of Albinus and Laenas (or, less frequently, year 581 Ab urbe condita). The denomination 173 BC for this year has been used since the early medieval period, when the Anno Domini calendar era became the prevalent method in Europe for naming years.

Events 
 By place 
 Egypt 
 Ptolemy VI Philometor marries his sister, Cleopatra II.

 Seleucid Empire 
 Antiochus IV pays the remainder of the war indemnity that has been imposed by the Romans on Antiochus III in the Treaty of Apamea (188 BC).

Births 
 Antiochus V Eupator, ruler of the Seleucid Empire from 164 BC (d. 162 BC)
 Wang Zhi, Chinese empress of the Han dynasty (d. 126 BC)

Deaths 
 Lucius Cornelius Lentulus, Roman consul and general

References